America's Forgotten War may refer to:
War of 1812 (1812-1815)
Apache Wars (1851–1900)
First Barbary War (1801–1805)
Second Barbary War (1815)
Philippine–American War (1899–1913) 
Boxer Rebellion (1899–1902)
Korean War (1950-1953)

See also
Forgotten war (disambiguation)